TS Class 6 was a series of sixteen trams built by Strømmens Værksted for Trondheim Sporvei. They were delivered in two slightly different batches; ten in 1948–49 and six in 1955.

They remained in service until the Dalsenget fire on 10 October 1956, in which all burnt down. It is the only class of trams that has not been preserved by the  Trondheim Tramway Museum.

References

Trondheim Tramway stock

600 V DC multiple units
Multiple units of Norway